The Comeback is an American comedy-drama television series produced by HBO that stars Lisa Kudrow as sitcom actress Valerie Cherish in modern-day Los Angeles. It was created by Kudrow and Michael Patrick King, a former executive producer of Sex and the City. Kudrow and King are also screenwriters and executive producers of the series, with King also serving as the director of some episodes. The series originally aired for a single season of 13 episodes from June 5 to September 4, 2005, before being cancelled. Nine years later, The Comeback was revived for a second season of 8 episodes that aired from November 9 to December 28, 2014.

The Comeback is a satirical and comedic look inside the entertainment television industry. It was shot by a two-camera crew.  The first season is presented as found footage shot for the fictional reality show within the series, also called The Comeback. The second season is presented as found footage shot by a camera crew originally commissioned by Valerie to pitch a pilot to noted reality TV producer Andy Cohen, later repurposed as behind the scenes web content, and then into a full-scale documentary. Kudrow said in an interview that she and Michael Patrick King have discussed potentially working on a third season of The Comeback once the latter's work on the Sex and the City reboot was done. Plot 

Season 1
The series initially follows Valerie Cherish (Kudrow), a veteran B-list sitcom actress who found fame on a sitcom called I'm It!, which ran from 1989 to 1993. Thereafter, she failed to find substantial acting work and fell out of the spotlight for more than a decade. In 2005, Valerie is cast as Aunt Sassy on a new network sitcom called Room and Bored and as part of landing the role, agrees to chronicle her return to the television industry on a reality television series called The Comeback. However, she continuously struggles with the matter of being an aging, non-influential performer in an increasingly youthful Hollywood, while her every move on and off the set is being documented for the companion reality series.

Season 2
In 2014, Valerie initially attempts to produce her own reality television pilot for producer Andy Cohen, having found that reality television has become significantly more popular since she made The Comeback nine years earlier. After she is cast as a fictionalized version of herself on an HBO series called Seeing Red, which chronicles the career of the sitcom writer and producer who tormented her nine years earlier on Room and Bored, the footage is repurposed as a documentary film capturing her second career resurgence as it threatens to destroy her personal life.

 Cast and characters 

Main

 Lisa Kudrow as Valerie Cherish, the central figure of The Comeback and the star of a 1989–1993 sitcom, I'm It!, in which she played a young superstar attorney named Becky. In the decade since, Valerie hasn't found acting work and has fallen out of the limelight. In the first season, she lands the role of Aunt Sassy on the new network sitcom Room and Bored and agrees to chronicle her return to the television industry on a companion reality television series called The Comeback. In the second season, Valerie is cast as a fictionalized version of herself on an HBO series called Seeing Red, which chronicles the career of Paulie G, the sitcom writer and producer who tormented her nine years earlier on Room and Bored.
 Damian Young as Mark Berman, Valerie's loving (and extremely patient) husband. They had lived a quiet lifestyle until camera crews invaded their privacy. 
 Robert Michael Morris as Mickey Deane, Valerie Cherish's hairdresser since the late 1980s and her closest friend.
 Laura Silverman as Jane Benson, the producer of Valerie Cherish's reality show, The Comeback. 
 Malin Åkerman as Juna Millken (starring season 1, recurring season 2), a beautiful, young, blonde musician, who (in her first-ever acting role) plays Cassie, the lead character and niece of Aunt Sassy on Room and Bored.
 Lance Barber as Paulie G, Valerie's main antagonist. He is one of the two co-creators, head writers, and executive producers of Room and Bored.
 Robert Bagnell as Tom Peterman (starring season 1, guest season 2), the other of the two co-creators, head writers, and executive producers of Room and Bored. While he tends to agree with Paulie G that Valerie is an overbearing presence, he treats her more tactfully than his partner.

Recurring
 Dan Bucatinsky as Billy Stanton, Valerie's publicist, hired to earn Valerie magazine covers. Billy is a second-rate publicist who is just starting his own agency.
 James Burrows as himself, the director of a few early Room and Bored episodes. 
 Bayne Gibby as Gigi Alexander, a naive playwright from New York City, who is hired to write for Room and Bored. 
 Lillian Hurst as Esperanza, Valerie and Mark's housekeeper. She is uncomfortable around the cameras, often simply staring into them with a suspicious glare on her face.
 Kellan Lutz as Chris MacNess. Chris portrays Mooner, Juna's roommate and love interest on Room and Bored. He is curious why Valerie is even on the show, due to the fact she is twice as old as the remainder of the cast. 

Season 1
 Kimberly Kevon Williams as Shayne Thomas. Shayne plays Dylan, Juna's roommate on Room and Bored Jason Olive as Jesse Wood. Jesse plays Stitch, one of Juna's male roommates on Room and Bored John H. Mayer as Wagner Fisk, Jimmy's replacement as the Room and Bored director
 Vanessa Marano as Francesca Berman, Valerie's preteen stepdaughter
 Maulik Pancholy and Amir Talai as Kaveen Kahan and Greg Narayan, a comedy duo brought in by the network to spice up Room and Bored as Juna's foreign pen pals
 Nathan Lee Graham as Peter, the wardrobe supervisor for Room and Bored Tom Virtue as Eddie, the stage manager of Room and BoredSeason 2
Seth Rogen as himself. Rogen is cast on Seeing Red as Mitch, the character based upon Paulie G. Rogen's charming personality and tendency to make sarcastic remarks helps to lighten tension on set. He has shown an ability to sense when Paulie G is being overly passive-aggressive toward Valerie, and he comes to her aid on more than one occasion in those situations.
Mark L. Young as Tyler Beck, Mark and Valerie's nephew, a production assistant (and general nuisance) on the documentary crew following Valerie
Meryl Hathaway as Andie Tate, a choreographer turned director who relieves Paulie G as the director of some of the later Seeing Red episodes
Rose Abdoo as Marianina, Valerie's secondary hairdresser, whose only job is to apply her wig
Brian Delate as Ron Wesson, the line producer for Seeing RedZoë Chao as Shayna, an assistant director for Seeing RedCameos
Because the show is set in modern-day Hollywood, celebrities and media personalities such as Andy Cohen, Chelsea Handler, Jane Kaczmarek, Jay Leno, Conan O'Brien, RuPaul, among others, often play themselves in cameo appearances.

DevelopmentThe Comeback was conceived in 2004 by Lisa Kudrow and Michael Patrick King, following the final seasons of the sitcom Friends (in which Kudrow starred as Phoebe Buffay) and the HBO comedy Sex and the City, on which King was a director, writer, and executive producer. The central character, Valerie Cherish, was an extension of a recurring character that Kudrow invented while doing improvisational comedy with The Groundlings in Los Angeles. The character, which Kudrow named "your favourite actress on a talkshow", was an egotistical celebrity who lacked self-awareness. Kudrow has cited The Office as an influence on the show's found-footage documentary format, as well as being inspired by the rise of reality television, and the humiliation such shows inflicted upon their participants.

Reception

Season 1

Despite a coveted time slot after the hit series Entourage, The Comeback debuted to low ratings. It was also met with a mixed critical response, yet it was nominated for three Primetime Emmy Awards, including Outstanding Lead Actress in a Comedy Series for Kudrow. HBO confirmed on September 21, 2005, that the series had been canceled after being on the air only 13 weeks. Its initial lukewarm reception and short run notwithstanding, The Comeback has been retrospectively lauded.

The show placed #79 on Entertainment Weeklys "New TV Classics" list. In 2009, the publication named The Comeback one of the 10 best shows of the decade, calling it "the most brilliantly brutal satire of reality TV ever captured on screen." In 2012, the magazine listed the show at #8 in the "25 Best Cult TV Shows from the Past 25 Years," saying, "Both painfully uncomfortable and deadpan hilarious, The Comeback was spot-on in its inside-showbiz look at the making of a sitcom – while featuring one of the decade's biggest sitcom stars, no less. But it was so inside, it was too inaccessible to a mass audience, or even an audience that might have returned for a second season on HBO." Entertainment Weekly also voted Valerie Cherish on The Comeback as Lisa Kudrow's second best performance.The New York Times gave the show a lukewarm review, dubbing it "interesting", but also complaining about a lack of originality in the concept and finding The Comeback ultimately less entertaining than its fellow HBO series Entourage.

In a commemorative article in 2012, UK newspaper The Guardian praised the show for its "bittersweet comedy" and Lisa Kudrow for her "ego-free acting." The newspaper questions whether, in an era where "you can't move for meta-sitcoms," this sitcom was just "too far ahead of its time."

Season 2
The second season was met with critical acclaim. On the review aggregator, Rotten Tomatoes the second season received an 84% approval rating giving it a "fresh" rating. It also scored a 71 out of 100 on Metacritic Robert Loyd of the Los Angeles Times praised the show saying "The current episodes have more weight and intensity; they come off a shade darker and yet more sympathetic to its cast of co-dependent lost souls." Joshua Alston of The A.V. Club also praised it, writing: "The Comeback is the same as it ever was, and more highly concentrated. It still out-metas anything else on television. The performances remain stellar all around." On the other hand, Kristi Turnquist gave the show a mixed review, writing: "While the first few episodes of the new Comeback make stingingly accurate points about the sexism and ageism Valerie has to contend with, The Comeback has its own problems. As in the first go-round, Valerie comes off as cartoonish, a caricature of a so-so celebrity." The last episode of Season 2, "Valerie Gets What She Really Wants", received almost universal praise, scoring 10/10 and A scores across the board.

Future

According to HBO, the show drew an average of 1.4 million viewers across its channels and on demand – Kudrow said she has not "heard it officially," but that she and King have gotten the impression that the door is open for more. Soon, she hopes she and King will begin to "talk about what more would look like."

In a 2014 interview with E!, Kudrow also had this to say: "I would love to do more. In 2005, that was an ending, that was definitely an ending because I guess now we see that those episodes were a piece and these episodes were a piece and then if we do more then we will be doing that piece."

On July 21, 2020, the cast reunited on the live streamed web series Stars in the House, raising money for Actors Fund of America.

Awards and nominations

Home media

DVD
"The Comeback – The Complete Only Season" was released on Region 1 DVD on August 1, 2006, with the Region 2 version released on September 18, 2006. The discs include all thirteen aired episodes as well as the following special features:
 Audio commentary on Episode 1 by Lisa Kudrow and Michael Patrick King
 Audio commentary on Episode 2 by Valerie Cherish
 Audio commentary on Episode 3 by Michael Patrick King
 Audio commentary on Episode 9 by Lisa Kudrow and Michael Patrick King
 Audio commentary on Episode 12 by Lisa Kudrow and Michael Patrick King
 Audio commentary on Episode 13 by Michael Patrick King
 "Valerie: After the Laughter" (8:47) is like an epilogue for Ms. Cherish as she tries to explain what she'll be doing now that Room and Bored and The Comeback have been put on hiatus.
 "Valerie Backstage at Dancing with the Stars" (6:12) is the sitcom/reality star backstage at Dancing with the Stars Both discs also offer an episode index

Season 2 was released on DVD August 4, 2015 in a combo-pack along with Season 1 entitled "The Comeback: Limited Series".  It will contain all 21 episodes of the series.

Video on demand
, both full seasons of The Comeback'' are available on-demand on HBO GO as well as Amazon Prime.

Notes and references

External links
 

2000s American comedy-drama television series
2000s American mockumentary television series
2000s American satirical television series
2005 American television series debuts
2005 American television series endings
2010s American comedy-drama television series
2010s American mockumentary television series
2010s American satirical television series
2014 American television series debuts
HBO original programming
Television series about actors
Television series about television
Television shows set in Los Angeles
Television series by Warner Bros. Television Studios
English-language television shows
American television series revived after cancellation
Television series created by Michael Patrick King
Television series created by Lisa Kudrow